Amos Pieper (born 17 January 1998) is a German professional footballer who plays as a defender for Bundesliga club Werder Bremen.

Career
On 28 January 2019, Pieper moved from Borussia Dortmund II to 2. Bundesliga club Arminia Bielefeld. He made his professional debut for Bielefeld in the 2. Bundesliga on 8 February 2019, coming on as a half-time substitute for Brian Behrendt in the 3–0 away win against Jahn Regensburg. In the 2021–22 season, he was relegated from the Bundesliga with Arminia Bielefeld.

In May 2022 it was announced that Pieper would join Werder Bremen, newly promoted to the Bundesliga, for the 2022–23 season. He moved on a free transfer.

Career statistics

Honours 
Germany U21
UEFA European Under-21 Championship: 2021

References

External links

1998 births
Living people
People from Lüdinghausen
Sportspeople from Münster (region)
Footballers from North Rhine-Westphalia
German footballers
Association football defenders
Germany under-21 international footballers
Germany youth international footballers
Olympic footballers of Germany
Footballers at the 2020 Summer Olympics
Borussia Dortmund II players
Arminia Bielefeld players
SV Werder Bremen players
Bundesliga players
2. Bundesliga players
Regionalliga players